The crested bobwhite (Colinus cristatus) is a species of bird in the family Odontophoridae. It is found in northern South America, extending through Panama to just reach Costa Rica. It also occurs on Aruba and the Netherlands Antilles. Its natural habitats are subtropical or tropical dry shrubland, subtropical or tropical seasonally wet or flooded lowland grassland, and heavily degraded former forest.

Description

The sexes are very similar in appearance. The long feathers on the fore-head and crown are pale buff or white, and the crest feathers may be dark. The back and sides of the neck are marbled in black and white and the throat is white or buff, sometimes spotted with black. The upper parts are mottled black, brown and grey. The underparts are pale, with buff, cinnamon and black markings. The eye is brown, the beak black and the legs bluish-grey. The female is slightly browner than the male.

Behaviour
The crested bobwhite occurs in small groups on the ground in or near thick cover and its behaviour is rather similar to that of the northern bobwhite (Colinus virginianus). The diet consists of buds, shoots, leaves and small invertebrates. The male's call, heard in the breeding season, is distinctive; a fast, husky, three-syllable "quoit bob-white" or a two-syllable "oh, wheet".

Status
The crested bobwhite has a very wide range and is common in much of that range. The population seems to be on the increase and the International Union for Conservation of Nature has assessed its conservation status as being of "least concern".

References

crested bobwhite
Birds of Panama
Birds of Colombia
Birds of Venezuela
Birds of the Netherlands Antilles
Birds of the Guianas
crested bobwhite
Taxonomy articles created by Polbot
Taxa named by Carl Linnaeus
Birds of the Caribbean